Uganda competed at the 2019 African Games held from 19 to 31 August 2019 in Rabat, Morocco. Initially 77 athletes were scheduled to represent Uganda. This later rose to 78 athletes. Athletes representing Uganda won two silver medals and eight bronze medals and the country finished in 28th place in the medal table.

Medal summary

Medal table 

|  style="text-align:left; width:78%; vertical-align:top;"|

|  style="text-align:left; width:22%; vertical-align:top;"|

3x3 basketball 

Uganda competed in 3x3 basketball. The women's team reached the quarterfinals in the women's tournament.

Athletics 

Uganda competed in athletics.

Jacent Nyamahunge competed in the women's 100 metres event. She finished in 13th place in the semifinals. She also competed in the women's 200 metres event where she finished in 15th place in the semifinals. Emily Nanziri also competed in the women's 200 metres event; she finished in 30th place in the heats and she did not advance.

Leni Shida competed in the women's 400 metres event. She finished in 6th place in the final.

Halimah Nakaayi won the bronze medal in the women's 800 metres event.

Esther Chebet finished in 5th place in the women's 1500 metres event.

Sarah Chelangat and Stella Chesang competed in the women's 5000 metres event and they finished in 4th and 7th place respectively. Chesang was also scheduled to compete in the women's 10,000 metres event but she did not start. Rachael Zena Chebet did compete in that event and she finished in 7th place.

In the women's 4 × 400 metres relay the bronze medal was won by Stella Wonruku, Nasiba Nabirye, Emily Nanziri and Leni Shida.

One athlete represented Uganda in the women's half marathon: Linet Toroitich Chebet. She finished in 9th place.

Two athletes represented Uganda in the women's javelin throw event: Josephine Joyce Lalam and Lucy Aber. They finished in 4th and 9th place respectively.

Badminton 

Uganda competed in badminton. Six players (three men and three women) represented Uganda in this discipline: Brian Kasirye, Devis Senono, Daniel Mihigo, Aisha Nakiyemba, Gladys Mbabazi and Mable Namakoye

Gladys Mbabazi and Aisha Nakiyemba won the bronze medal in the women's doubles event.

Boxing 

Uganda competed in boxing. Six men and two women were scheduled to represent Uganda in boxing: Shadir Musa Bwogi, Champion Busingye, Isaac Masembe, Joshua Tukamuhebwa, David Kavuma Ssemujju, Solomon Geko, Hellen Baleke and Jalia Nalia.

In total, two silver medals and one bronze medal were won in boxing.

Chess 

Uganda competed in chess. Two chess players were scheduled to compete: Arthur Ssegwanyi and Harold Wanyama. Wanyama won the country a bronze medal during the Men's rapid individual event.

Cycling 

Uganda competed in cycling. No cyclists won a medal.

Handball 

Uganda women's national handball team competed in the women's tournament and they reached the quarterfinals where they were eliminated by the Angola women's team.

Swimming 

Two athletes represented Uganda in swimming.

Men

Women

Table tennis 

Amina Lukaaya, Eddy Omongole, Rita Nakhumitsa and Ludia Magandlen Natunga competed in table tennis.

Tennis 

Uganda entered two tennis players into the African Games.

Men

Weightlifting 

Uganda competed in weightlifting. Four athletes were scheduled to compete: Davis Niyoyita, Julius Ssekitoleko, Hakim Musoke Ssempereza and Zubairi Kubo.

Zubairi Kubo won the bronze medals in all three men's 96kg events.

See also	
 Uganda at the African Games

References 

Nations at the 2019 African Games
2019
African Games